Anivsky District is an administrative district (raion) of Sakhalin Oblast, Russia; one of the seventeen in the oblast. Municipally, it is incorporated as Anivsky Urban Okrug. It is located in the south of the oblast. Its administrative center is the town of Aniva. Population:  The population of Aniva accounts for 52.0% of the district's total population.

References

Notes

Sources
 
 

Districts of Sakhalin Oblast